Farmersville may refer to several places in the United States:
Farmersville, California
Farmersville, Georgia
Farmersville, Illinois
Farmersville, Indiana
Farmersville, Kentucky
Farmerville, Louisiana, also known as "Farmersville"
Farmersville, Missouri
Farmersville, New Jersey
Farmersville, New York
Farmersville, Pennsylvania
Farmersville, Ohio
Farmersville, Texas
Farmersville, Wisconsin

See also
Farmville (disambiguation)
Acton, Indiana, originally known as Farmersville
Athens, Ontario, originally known as Farmersville